Calcium hydroxyphosphate (calcium phosphate tribasic, tribasic calcium phosphate, hydroxyapatite, HAp) is an inorganic chemical compound that is made up of calcium, hydrogen, oxygen and phosphorus. Its formula is Ca5(OH)(PO4)3.

It is found in the body and as the mineral hydroxyapatite.

References

Calcium compounds